Jonathan James Harrison Flatt (born 12 September 1994) is an English footballer who plays for  side Rushall Olympic, where he plays as a goalkeeper.

Playing career

Wolverhampton Wanderers
Flatt is a product of Wolverhampton Wanderers' academy, having been at the club since the age of eight. He signed his first professional contract with the club in 2014, but has yet to make a senior appearance in a competitive fixture for them.

He made his senior football debut for Wrexham during a loan spell in 2014 during which he made five appearances in total. He then went out on loan to Chesterfield in 2015, but failed to make an appearance.

He was then loaned out to Cheltenham Town where he made 10 appearances towards the end of the 2015–16 season, helping the club win the National League title.

In January 2017, he joined National League club Barrow on loan for the rest of the 2016–17 season, during which he made 25 appearances in all competitions.

In June 2017, he rejoined Cheltenham Town on a season-long loan, but was recalled 6 months later, after only making 7 appearances in all competitions for the League Two side.

In February 2018, he joined National League North club Kidderminster Harriers on loan for a month.

He was released by Wolves at the end of the 2017–18 season.

Scunthorpe United
On 10 July 2018, he signed a one-year deal with League One club Scunthorpe United after a successful trial.

He was released by Scunthorpe at the end of the 2018–19 season.

Rushall Olympic
On 23 August 2019, Flatt was confirmed as signing for Southern League Premier Division Central side Rushall Olympic.

Coaching career

After retiring from professional football, Flatt became a goalkeeping coach at Aston Villa. After 2 years at Villa, Flatt would return to Wolverhampton Wanderers in late 2022 as a goalkeeping coach for the Wolves academy, linking up with Tony Roberts.

Honours
Cheltenham Town
National League: 2015–16

Career statistics

Club

References

External links

1994 births
Living people
English footballers
Association football goalkeepers
Wolverhampton Wanderers F.C. players
Wrexham A.F.C. players
Chesterfield F.C. players
Barrow A.F.C. players
Cheltenham Town F.C. players
Scunthorpe United F.C. players
Rushall Olympic F.C. players
English Football League players
Kidderminster Harriers F.C. players